Christopher Luke O'Neill (born 21 November 1990), also known by his Internet pseudonym Oney or OneyNG, is an Irish animator, YouTuber, voice actor, musician, and video game designer. He is known for his Flash animations and being the founder and host of the YouTube Let's Play web series OneyPlays. He is also the owner of the video game production company OneyWare.

Career
O'Neill began his online career on the American entertainment website Newgrounds, creating an account on March 28, 2006. He created a YouTube channel at age 17, and by 2013, it was ranked as Ireland's most successful YouTube channel with a total of 240 million views. The channel's content includes animated music videos, video game parodies, and original series, such as Leo and Satan and Hellbenders, the latter of which was made with fellow Newgrounds animator Zach Hadel (psychicpebbles).

In 2014, O'Neill began posting Let's Play video content to the Oney's Video Hole channel, later renamed OneyPlays. The channel became prominent in 2017 for starting the Crash Bandicoot "Woah" Internet meme based on a common sound-effect from the PlayStation series. The meme was referenced in an easter egg in the 2020 video-game Crash Bandicoot 4: It's About Time. The channel features regular appearances from other YouTubers, animators and independent game developers including Zach Hadel, Joshua Tomar, Lyle Rath and Cory Beck, after having featured Julian Marcel and the pseudonymous Ding Dong as co-hosts before they each left the show. Guest appearances include Matt Watson of SuperMega, Mick Lauer and Jon Jafari.

YouTuber Jason Gastrow, known online as videogamedunkey, mentioned in a 2015 Reddit thread that O'Neill designed his YouTube channel profile picture. O'Neill would later make appearances on Gastrow's channel.

In 2019, O'Neill created the game studio OneyWare. A gameplay trailer for Bowlbo: The Quest for Bing Bing, an upcoming video game developed by OneyWare in collaboration with AlbinoMoose, was released in March 2019.

O'Neill collaborated again with Hadel when he and animator Michael Cusack created the Adult Swim animated show Smiling Friends. In 2020, O'Neill created the ending credit music for the pilot episode of the series as well as 3D modeling and animation. He later also voiced multiple background characters when the show was picked up for a full season.

Filmography

Television

Web

References

External links 
 OneyNG
 OneyPlays
 Chris O'Neill at IMDb

1990 births
Flash artists
21st-century Irish comedians
Irish animators
Irish expatriates in the United States
Irish male voice actors
Irish surrealist artists
Irish YouTubers
Irish video game actors
Irish video game designers
Comedy YouTubers
Let's Players
Living people
People from Wexford, County Wexford
Web series producers
YouTube animators
YouTube channels launched in 2008
Video game writers
Newgrounds people